The Bumpe Chiefdom is a Chiefdom of Sierra Leone located in Moyamba District, Southern Province, Sierra Leone. It is centred on Rotifunk. The chiefdom comprises 208 villages.

Bumpe chiefs
 1820–1832 Thomas Stephen Caulker, also known as Bar Tham
 1832–1842 Charles Caulker
 1842–1857 James Canreba Caulker
 1857–1864 Thomas Augustus Caulker (Tham Bum)
 1864–1888 Richard Canreba Caulker (exiled to Gambia)
 1888–1895 Vacant
 1895–1898 Richard Canreba Caulker (2nd time), deposed
 1899–1902 James Canreba Caulker
 1902–1907 John Canreba Caulker
 1907–1921 Thomas Canreba Caulker
 1921–1954 Albert Gbosowah Caulker
 1954–1983 William I. Caulker
 1984–present Charles B. Caulker

References

Government of Sierra Leone
Sierra Leone politics-related lists